Joel "Fingers" Wright (born August 27, 1980) is a Canadian football safety for the Montreal Alouettes of the Canadian Football League. He was drafted by the Alouettes in the third round of the 2004 CFL Draft, and has spent the past two seasons on the practice roster of the Montreal Allouettes, following an unsuccessful tryout with the Green Bay Packers. He played CIS Football at Wilfrid Laurier.

External links
Montreal Alouettes bio
CFLapedia bio

1980 births
Living people
Players of Canadian football from Ontario
Canadian football defensive backs
Wilfrid Laurier Golden Hawks football players
Montreal Alouettes players
Sportspeople from Hamilton, Ontario